This list of historical markers installed by the National Historical Commission of the Philippines (NHCP) in Davao Region (Region XI) is an annotated list of people, places, or events in the region that have been commemorated by cast-iron plaques issued by the said commission. The plaques themselves are permanent signs installed in publicly visible locations on buildings, monuments, or in special locations.

While many Cultural Properties have historical markers installed, not all places marked with historical markers are designated into one of the particular categories of Cultural Properties.

This article lists nine (9) markers from the Davao Region.

Davao del Norte
This article lists one (1) marker from the Province of Davao del Norte.

Davao del Sur
This article lists four (4) markers from the Province of Davao del Sur.

Davao de Oro 
This article lists no markers from the Province of Davao de Oro.

Davao Occidental
This article lists three (3) markers from the Province of Davao Occidental.

Davao Oriental
This article lists one (1) marker from the Province of Davao Oriental.

See also
List of Cultural Properties of the Philippines in the Davao Region

References

Footnotes

Bibliography 

A list of sites and structures with historical markers, as of 16 January 2012
A list of institutions with historical markers, as of 16 January 2012

External links
A list of sites and structures with historical markers, as of 16 January 2012 
A list of institutions with historical markers, as of 16 January 2012 
National Registry of Historic Sites and Structures in the Philippines
Policies on the Installation of Historical Markers

History of the Davao Region
Davao